Canada competed at the 2006 Winter Olympics in Turin, Italy, with a team of 196 athletes and 220 support staff.

As host of the upcoming 2010 Winter Olympics, Canada was pressured to do well at the 2006 Games. The Canadian Olympic Committee's goal for 2006 was to have a top three finish in the medal count or 25 total medals, as a start to reach their goal of having the highest medal count at the 2010 Winter Olympics in Vancouver, British Columbia. Canada had managed to increase its medal count at each Winter Olympics since the 1980 Winter Olympics in Lake Placid, New York, United States. World Cup results from the 2005–06 season seemed to indicate that Canada would have a good performance in Turin, Italy. Canada met one of those goals and nearly met the other by finishing third behind the United States and Germany with 24 medals. The Games were also the first litmus test for the increased athletic funding and resources pursued by the Own the Podium 2010 program.

Another task for the Canadian contingent was to promote the 2010 Games, Vancouver and surrounding region, the province of British Columbia, as well as Canada as a nation. This was evident in the Canadian participation in the closing ceremonies of the Games and the establishment of the Canada House in Turin. The Games also provided opportunities for organizing committees to gather experience and strategies to run the Games in Vancouver.

Medalists 
Canada's total medal count of 24 was the highest ever won by the nation in any Winter Olympics, and was the second highest total for the country at any Olympic games (summer or winter), exceeded only by the 44 medals won at the 1984 Summer Olympics which were boycotted by the Soviet Union and other Eastern Bloc countries. Not only did Canada increase its total medal count from the previous Winter Games for the 7th straight time (since 1980), but the total medal count was also the "best ever" for Canada for the 5th straight time (since 1992).

Canada won at least one medal in 10 of the 15 sport disciplines competed at the games, and gold medals in 6 different disciplines; both feats were unmatched by any other nation. Canada also had the most 4th and 5th-place finishes (14 and 9 respectively) of any country in these games. These results support the effectiveness of the Own the Podium 2010 program.

Cindy Klassen bested the total Olympic medals collected in a single Games by a Canadian, with 5, and bested the total Olympic medal count of any Canadian (Winter and Summer) with 6. The previous record of 3 medals at a single Olympics was held by Gaetan Boucher for the 1984 Winter Olympics and Marc Gagnon at the 2002 Winter Olympics. Meanwhile, Clara Hughes tied the old mark of 5 career Olympic medals, held by Marc Gagnon and Phil Edwards. Sixteen of the 24 medals were won by female athletes. At age 50, Russ Howard became the oldest Canadian gold medalist in Olympic history.

| style="text-align:left; vertical-align:top;"|

| style="text-align:left; vertical-align:top;"|

Alpine skiing 

Men

Women

Note: In the men's combined, run 1 is the downhill, and runs 2 and 3 are the slalom. In the women's combined, run 1 and 2 are the slalom, and run 3 the downhill.

Biathlon

Bobsleigh

Cross-country skiing 

Sean Crooks was suspended for 5 days by the International Ski Federation for having excessive hemoglobin levels. He was able to participate in the men's sprint and 4× 10 km relay.

Distance

Sprint

Curling

Men's 

: Brad Gushue, Mark Nichols, Russ Howard (skip), Jamie Korab, Mike Adam (alternate)

The Canadian foursome won the country's first Olympic medal in men's curling, and became the first Winter Olympic gold medal winners from the province of Newfoundland and Labrador. Russ Howard was designated the skip by World Curling Federation rules, but Gushue threw last stones, and was considered to be the team leader.

Gushue's rink finished first in the round-robin at the Canadian Olympic Curling Trials, then beat Jeff Stoughton in the final to secure the Olympic berth.

Round-robin
Draw 2
;Draw 3
;Draw 4
;Draw 5
;Draw 6
;Draw 8
;Draw 9
;Draw 11
;Draw 12

Standings

Playoffs
Semifinal
;Final

The Minister of Education for Newfoundland and Labrador canceled classes across the province in the afternoon to allow children to watch the game.

Women's 

: Shannon Kleibrink (skip), Amy Nixon, Glenys Bakker, Christine Keshen, Sandra Jenkins (alternate)

Shannon Kleibrink's rink finished third in the round-robin at the Canadian Olympic Curling Trials, then won the semifinal over Stefanie Lawton and the final over Kelly Scott to secure the Olympic berth.

Round-robin
Draw 1
;Draw 2
;Draw 3
;Draw 5
;Draw 6
;Draw 7
;Draw 8
;Draw 10
;Draw 12

Standings

Playoffs
Semifinal
;Bronze final

Key: The hammer indicates which team had the last stone in the first end.

Figure skating 

Key: CD = Compulsory Dance, FD = Free Dance, FS = Free Skate, OD = Original Dance, SP = Short Program

Freestyle skiing 

Jennifer Heil became the first Canadian woman to ever win gold in freestyle skiing after winning for women's moguls. At the 2002 Winter Olympics in Salt Lake City, she finished fourth and ended up a hundredth of a point off the podium.

Dale Begg-Smith, who won gold in men's moguls for Australia, was born in Canada and holds dual citizenship. He originally started skiing in Canada but found Canada's training program too restrictive. He moved to Australia to have more time to work on his business interests. Ironically, his win bumped Marc-André Moreau down to 4th place and off of the podium.

Men

Women

Ice hockey 

Hockey, like the previous two Olympics, attracted significant attention from Canadian fans. Many consider the Canadian men's team's performance in Turin as the most disappointing in years. In the last four games of the tournament, Canada failed to score in 11 of 12 periods, losing with the same score (2–0) against Switzerland, Finland, and in the quarterfinals against Russia. Hockey commentators, including Kelly Hrudey, commented that Canada did not play well as a team. The match against the Czech Republic was believed to be a better performance by the hockey team but the team lost to Russia two days after.

The quarterfinal game against Russia was watched on television screens across the nation in the afternoon Canadian time. The intensity of the game increased as the scoreless tie extended into the third period.

However, in the women's hockey discipline, Team Canada dominated the field with numerous wins leading up to their gold medal winning game.

Men's

Players

Round-robin

Medal round

Quarterfinal

Women's 

Players

Round-robin

Medal round

Semifinal

Final

Luge

Nordic combined 

Note: 'Deficit' refers to the amount of time behind the leader a competitor began the cross-country portion of the event. Italicized numbers show the final deficit from the winner's finishing time.

Short track speed skating 

Men

Women

Key: 'ADV' indicates a skater was advanced due to being interfered with.

Skeleton 

Mellisa Hollingsworth-Richards won a bronze medal in Skeleton, thus becoming the first Canadian to win an Olympic medal in the event. A day later, Duff Gibson became the first Canadian to win a gold medal in the event after taking the men's gold. Fellow Canadian Jeff Pain won the silver medal, and there were chances of a bronze as well; however, their teammate placed fourth.

Gibson, 39, became the oldest competitor to win an individual gold medal in Winter Olympics history, surpassing Al MacInnis as the oldest Canadian to win a gold medal. MacInnis won gold at the 2002 Winter Olympics on the Canadian men's hockey team.

Ski jumping 

Note: PQ indicates a skier was pre-qualified for the final, based on entry rankings.

Snowboarding 

Maëlle Ricker and Dominique Vallee competed in two of the Snowboarding disciplines, halfpipe and snowboard cross, while Jasey-Jay Anderson competed in snowboard cross and parallel giant slalom.

Halfpipe

Note: In the final, the single best score from two runs is used to determine the ranking. A bracketed score indicates a run that wasn't counted.

Parallel GS

Key: '+ Time' represents a deficit; the brackets indicate the results of each run.

Snowboard cross

Speed skating 

Canada became the first country to set a new record at the 2006 Winter Olympics when both its men's and women's teams set an Olympic record in the qualifying round of the team pursuit.

Cindy Klassen set or tied several medal records. She became the first Canadian to win five medals in one Olympics, winning a gold (1500 m), two silver medals (team pursuit, 1000 m) and two bronze medals (3000 m, 5000 m). Her bronze medal at the 2002 Winter Olympics gives her a total of six medals and the title of the most decorated Canadian Olympian, winter or summer. Tied at five medals for Canada are short track speed skater Marc Gagnon, track athlete Dr. Phil Edwards, and speed skater Clara Hughes, who won her fourth and fifth medal at the 2006 Olympics. In addition to the Canadian medal records, Klassen also tied Eric Heiden to win the most medals by a speed skater at a single Olympics.

Men

Women

Team pursuit

Flag bearer 
Women's ice hockey player Danielle Goyette carried the flag for Canada in the opening ceremony. Cross-country skier Beckie Scott, bobsledder Pierre Lueders, long-track speedskaters Cindy Klassen and Clara Hughes all said that they would not submit their names to carry the flag.

Scott, Klassen and Hughes all had events within two days of the opening ceremonies and believed that not participating in the opening ceremonies would give them a better chance at a finishing well in their events. Lueders turned down the chance because at the time it appeared that his bobsleigh partner, Lascelles Brown, would not be granted Canadian citizenship. Afterwards, Lueders said he would carry the flag but said that Brown would be a much better choice.

Some criticized these choices, including hockey analyst Don Cherry, who called the athletes unpatriotic and said that other athletes would have loved to have had the opportunity. Others, including past flag bearer Catriona Le May Doan spoke in favour of their decisions, saying that the opening ceremonies were a long process and took a lot of energy. She criticized Don Cherry, saying that many athletes in the past had turned down the flag-bearing opportunity at the opening ceremonies in order to focus on their competition, and that Don Cherry, having never participated in international athletic competition, does not have the right to be critical of Olympic athletes.

After winning five medals (more than any other Canadian at a Winter Games), Cindy Klassen accepted the selection as the flag bearer for the closing ceremonies.

Other participation 
As the host nation of the next Winter Games, Canada's role was to promote the 2010 Winter Olympics, its host city, its host province, and the country over the duration of these Games. Canada House was a log cabin constructed with Canadian pine wood and it was one of 12 nation's houses established in Turin. The pavilion opened its doors to the public on January 23, 2006, at piazza Valdo Fusi, in the city centre and would remain open until March 20 at the conclusion of the Paralympic Winter Games. Aside from showcasing Canadian culture, the building would host meetings for companies from British Columbia and Italy who would be interested to develop business partnerships. The building would be donated to the city of Turin and would be transferred to a new city park after the Games.

During the closing ceremonies of these Games, there was a brief segment in which Canada delivered a preview of the 2010 Games. This included a choreographed program featuring Avril Lavigne, raising of the Canadian flag, and singing of O Canada by opera star Ben Heppner, himself a B.C. native. The handover of the Games was highlighted by Vancouver mayor Sam Sullivan, a quadriplegic, accepting and waving the Olympic flag. Aside from the flag handed from the mayor of Turin Sergio Chiamparino, the City of Vancouver is now the custodian of the actual Olympic flag lowered at Stadio Olimpico during the closing ceremonies.

British Columbia Premier Gordon Campbell, himself a Vancouver native, and Governor General Michaëlle Jean attended the Games' competitions and closing ceremonies. They also availed themselves to the news media, sharing their thoughts about British Columbia and Canada welcoming the world in 2010. The federal government was represented by the attendance of Foreign Affairs Minister Peter MacKay at the closing ceremonies.

A number of Canadian citizens with dual citizenship have competed for other countries and served as their respective flag bearers:
 Dale Begg-Smith carried the flag of Australia during the closing ceremonies
 Tuğba Karademir carried the flag of Turkey during the opening ceremonies
 Mathieu Razanakolona carried the flag of Madagascar during the opening and closing ceremonies as the sole competitor of the country

In Ottawa, Prime Minister Stephen Harper said in a statement that the Olympic flame had begun the journey to Vancouver.

Notes 
 2006 was the first year since 1988 that Canada had athletes competing in Nordic combined and the first since 1992 that Canada had athletes in ski jumping.
 While skiing in the final of the women's team sprint in cross-country skiing, Sara Renner broke her ski pole. Fortunately, a coach immediately handed her a new pole. It was later revealed that the coach was not from Canada, but from Norway. Sara Renner and her partner Beckie Scott went on to win a silver medal in the event. Ironically, the Norwegian team finished fourth, so people conclude that if not for the coach then perhaps it would have been Norway that won a medal and not Canada.
 Lascelles Brown, who previously competed for Jamaica, competed for Canada in bobsleigh. He would go on to win a silver medal in two-man bobsleigh with partner Pierre Lueders.

Official outfitter 

HBC became the official outfitter of clothing for members of the Canadian Olympic team and replacing Roots Canada. The same clothing was also sold at HBC stores in Canada. HBC had been the official outfitters for Canada's Winter teams in 1936, 1960, 1964 and 1968.

References

External links 

Olympics
2006
Nations at the 2006 Winter Olympics